Gandhinagar Assembly constituency is one of the 87 constituencies in the Jammu and Kashmir Legislative Assembly of Jammu and Kashmir a north state of India. It is one of the most posche areas of the Union Territory of Jammu and Kashmir. The area is well known for its facilities in the Union Territory. 
Gandhinagar is also part of Jammu Lok Sabha constituency.

Member of Legislative Assembly
 1996: Choudhary Piara Singh, Bharatiya Janata Party
 2002: Raman Bhalla, Indian National Congress
 2008: Raman Bhalla, Indian National Congress

Election results

2014

See also
 Gandhinagar
 Jammu district
 List of constituencies of Jammu and Kashmir Legislative Assembly

References

Assembly constituencies of Jammu and Kashmir
Jammu district